Frank E. Linskey (August 18, 1913 – July 3, 1999) was an American professional basketball player and coach. He played for the Oshkosh All-Stars and Chicago Bruins in the National Basketball League and averaged 2.9 points per game. He served as a player-coach for the Bruins during the 1940–41 season where the team finished with 11 wins and 13 losses.

Linskey worked for Sears after his basketball career, retiring and moving to Florida in 1974. He eventually moved to Southfield, Michigan.

References

1913 births
1999 deaths
United States Army personnel of World War II
American men's basketball players
Basketball players from Chicago
Chicago Bruins coaches
Chicago Bruins players
DePaul Blue Demons men's basketball players
Guards (basketball)
Oshkosh All-Stars players
Player-coaches
People from Braidwood, Illinois
Sears Holdings people
Sportspeople from Chicago
Sportspeople from Southfield, Michigan